Rossinver or Rosinver is a small village in north County Leitrim, Ireland. The village is home to a retired monastery of the same name and is at the southern shore of Lough Melvin, home to two rare species of trout – the Gillaroo and the Sonaghan – as well as the common brown trout. There is a fishery at Eden Quay and boats and gillies are available locally. There is a mile-long river walk to Fowley's Falls on the Glenaniff River which follows a series of waterfalls.

History

The first church on the site was founded by Saint Máedóc of Ferns who died in Country Leitrim circa 632. Before he died, Saint Máedóc made the Connachta nobleman Fearghus Mac Ailill his hereditary heir to Rosinver Abbey and Fearghus was the first Abbot of Rosinver. The Ó Fearghuis later left County Leitrim to conquer the territory of Annaly in the neighbouring County Longford.

A 9th century grave slab lies in the church yard and Lisdarush Iron Age Fort and Abbey are nearby. The church is located on the north-eastern side of a graveyard which has a number of cross slabs of Early Christian date and a slab bearing rock art and a fragment of trefoil-headed arcading among the much later burial monuments of the second millennium. As for much of the Irish monasteries, Rosinver Abbey was dissolved in the Dissolution of the Monasteries in the 16th century. MacClancy Castle, also nearby, was a place of refuge on Lough Melvin for survivors and shipwrecked sailors from the Spanish Armada of 1588. There is a related plaque at the lakeside. Rosinver Abbey has otherwise been known throughout history as Gubalaun Abbey or St. Mogue’s Church (Mogue being a pet name for Saint Máedóc). The church is a dilapidated medieval masonry building undergoing conservation works as of 2020.

Transport

On Fridays Bus Éireann route 470 provides a link to Manorhamilton to connect with the express to Sligo.

See also
 List of towns and villages in Ireland
 Aber and Inver (placename elements)

References

Towns and villages in County Leitrim